This is the glossary of the common filesystem features table.

The intention of this table is to provide an at-a-glance list of features and specifications for each filesystem.

Inventor
List the names of those credited with the design of the filesystem specification.  This should not include those responsible for writing the implementation.

Name
The full, non abbreviated, name of the filesystem itself.

Native operating system
The name of the operating system in which this filesystem debuted.

Partition identificator
The partitioning scheme and marker used to identify that a partition is formatted to this filesystem.

Bad sector allocation
Describe how the filesystem allocates and isolates bad sectors.

File allocation
Describes how the filesystem allocates sectors in-use by files.

Directory structure
Describes how the subdirectories are implemented.

Namespace
Lists the characters that are legal within file and directory names.

Maximum filename size
The maximum number of characters that a file or directory name may contain.

Maximum files
The maximum number of files the filesystem can handle.

Maximum volume size
The maximum size of a volume that the filesystem specification can handle.  This may differ from the maximum size an operating system supports using a given implementation of the filesystem.

Dates handled
What type of dates and times the filesystem can support, which may include:

Creation date
This is the date the file was “created” on the volume. This does not change when working normally with a file, e.g. opening, closing, saving, or modifying the file.

Access date
This is the date the file was last accessed. An access can be a move, an open, or any other simple access. It can also be tripped by Anti-virus scanners, or Windows system processes. Therefore, caution has to be used when stating a “file was last accessed by user XXX” if there is only the “File Access” date in NTFS to work from.

Modified date
This date as shown by Windows there has been a change to the file itself. E.g. if a notepad document has more data added to it, this would trip the date it was modified.

Changed date
The date and time related attributes were modified.  This may include ACLs and the file/directory name.

Backed-up date
The date and time when the file was last backed up.

Maximum date
The maximum year that can be handled by the filesystem, as per the specification.

Attributes
Lists the basic file attributes available.

Named streams
Determines if the filesystems supports multiple data streams.  NTFS refers to these as alternate data streams, HPFS as extended attributes and HFS calls them forks.

Per-volume compression
Does the filesystem support real-time transparent compression and decompression of an entire volume.

Per-volume encryption
Does the filesystem support real-time transparent encryption and decryption of an entire volume.

Per-file compression
Does the filesystem support real-time transparent compression and decompression of individual files.

Per-file encryption
Does the filesystem support real-time transparent encryption and decryption of individual files.

Access control lists
Does the filesystem support multi-user access control lists (ACLs).

Computer file systems